Sten Gunnar Bergh (20 March 1909 – 25 January 1986) was a Swedish athlete who specialized in the shot put and discus throw. He competed in these events at the 1936 Summer Olympics and finished in ninth and seventh place, respectively.

At the 1938 European Championships Bergh won a bronze medal in the discus and finished fifth in the shot put. He won the Swedish titles in the shot put in 1935–42 and 1937–41 and in the discus in 1943–44. Bergh improved the Swedish shot put record several times, and his last record stood for 11 years.

Bergh trained as a boxer before changing to athletics, and worked as a policeman in Gothenburg. His daughter Wivianne also became an Olympic discus thrower.

References

1909 births
1986 deaths
Swedish male discus throwers
Swedish male shot putters
Olympic athletes of Sweden
Athletes (track and field) at the 1936 Summer Olympics
European Athletics Championships medalists